BBE may refer to:

 BBE, a sound enhancement technology
 B.B.E., a dance music group
 Bad Boy Entertainment, an American hip hop and R&B record label founded by Sean "Diddy" Combs
 Baldwin Beach Express, a highway in Alabama
 Bangba language
 Barako Bull Energy, a Philippine Basketball Association team
 Barely Breaking Even, a British record label
 Belgrade-Brooten-Elrosa School District, in Minnesota
 Bible in Basic English, a 1949 translation of the Bible
 Bickerstaff brainstem encephalitis
 Bijzondere Bijstands Eenheid, now M-Squadron, a Dutch special forces unit